Prairie Township is one of six townships in Tipton County, Indiana, United States. As of the 2010 census, its population was 1,140 and it contained 482 housing units.

History

Prior to becoming a township, a portion of the land was Miami Indian reservation land. White squatters did settle illegally in the area. The first known named white settler in the area was Alexander Suite. He came to Indiana in 1842 originally Tennessee. Suite built the first log cabin in the township. He eventually relocated to Russiaville, Indiana, eventually. Upon forced relocation of the Miami Indians, the land became available for purchase in 1847.

The Prairieville Cemetery, the first in the township, was founded in 1844. The first frame house was built in 1850.

Geography

Prior to 1849, Prairie Township was larger than it is today. The western half of Liberty Township was located in Prairie Township.

Natural environment

Historically, Prairie Township was very flat. The soil is thick and conducive to being agriculturally beneficial. The western side of the township was slough or prairie. An extensive drainage system was installed throughout the township which led to the draining of the slough areas, allowing for more farming. White settlers cleared out a large portion of the trees for lumber. Prior to this, the township was plentiful with walnut, beech, maple, elm, ash, willow and spicebush.

Unincorporated towns
 Groomsville at

Adjacent townships
 Harrison Township, Howard County (north)
 Taylor Township, Howard County (northeast)
 Liberty Township (east)
 Cicero Township (southeast)
 Jefferson Township (south)
 Johnson Township, Clinton County (southwest)
 Forest Township, Clinton County (west)
 Honey Creek Township, Howard County (northwest)

Government

Political districts
 Indiana's 5th congressional district
 State House District 32
 State Senate District 21

Education

The first school in the township was built in 1845. Oren Williams was the first teacher. He was paid using a subscription model. Terms were three months long and he was paid $1.25 per term per student. Public schools became part of the community in 1852.

Today

Students in Prairie Township attend Tri-Central Community Schools.

Infrastructure

Major highways
  U.S. Route 31

Cemeteries
The Prairieville Cemetery was founded in 1844, it was the first in the township. The Normanda Cemetery was founded after the Prairieville Cemetery, followed by the founding of the Liberty Cemetery.

References

Sources

 Pershing, Marvin W. "History of Tipton County, Indiana: Her People, Industries and Institutions". Indianapolis: B.F. Bowen (1914).

External links
 Indiana Township Association
 United Township Association of Indiana

Townships in Tipton County, Indiana
Kokomo, Indiana metropolitan area
Townships in Indiana